True Grit is a compilation album released by American rock and country singer Bret Michaels of the band Poison. The album was released digitally on May 5, 2015 and on limited edition cd via his website. The album was officially announced through Michael's social media sites in early April 2015 along with the release of the new single "Girls On Bars" which boasted the highest number of views of any debut single ever on CMT.

Production and recording
The album features three new original tracks and eighteen previously released country rock tracks from his last four studio albums: "Songs of Life", "Freedom of Sound", "Custom Built" and the most recent alternate versions album "Jammin' with Friends" which features guest musicians.

The new tracks include: "A Beautiful Soul" which was first released as a single in April 2014 featuring a music video and the new single "Girls On Bars" which was co written with Grammy award winning songwriter of the year, Luke Laird featuring a music video released May 12. Also included is the new song "Get Undone".

Many of the songs on the album are new renditions of older songs, some of the recordings go as far back as 2002. "True Grit is really a record of just taking songs like "Nothin' but a Good Time" and re-making them from the catalog of my past, and then my present, and then my future," said Michaels.

Track listing

References

Bret Michaels albums
2015 compilation albums